The 1998–99 New York Islanders season was the 27th season in the franchise's history. The Islanders had yet another disappointing season and were unable to qualify for the playoffs for the fifth straight year.

Off-season

Regular season

Final standings

Schedule and results

Player statistics

Regular season
Scoring

Goaltending

Draft picks
New York's draft picks at the 1998 NHL Entry Draft held at the Marine Midland Arena in Buffalo, New York.

References
Bibliography
 
 

New York Islanders seasons
New York Islanders
New York Islanders
New York Islanders
New York Islanders